Jonathan Michael Chi-Kit Bliss (born 5 October 1990) is a Hong Kong former footballer.

Career statistics

Club

Notes

References

External links
 Yau Yee Football League profile
 

Living people
1990 births
Hong Kong footballers
Association football midfielders
Hong Kong First Division League players
Hong Kong Premier League players
Hong Kong FC players